Wied's tyrant-manakin (Neopelma aurifrons) is a species of bird in the family Pipridae. It is endemic to Atlantic moist forests in eastern Brazil. It was previously considered conspecific with Neopelma chrysolophum. It is threatened by habitat loss.

References

External links
BirdLife Species Factsheet.

Wied's tyrant-manakin
Birds of the Atlantic Forest
Endemic birds of Brazil
Wied's tyrant-manakin
Taxonomy articles created by Polbot